Condea verticillata, commonly known as John Charles, is a species of flowering plant in the family Lamiaceae. It is found in Mexico, Florida, Central America, the Caribbean, and northwestern South America. It has also been introduced to Hawaii.

John Charles is used in traditional medicine to treat a variety of conditions including coughs, colds, fever, tonsillitis, bronchitis, uterine fibroids, skin infections, and stomach ache. The leaf and stem of the plant contain the lignan podophyllotoxin.

References

External links 

 Condea verticillata at Tropicos

Lamiaceae
Plants described in 1787
Flora of Mexico
Flora of Central America
Flora of the Caribbean
Flora without expected TNC conservation status